is a Japanese rugby sevens player. He played at the 2015 ARFU Men's Sevens Championships where Japan beat Hong Kong to qualify for the Olympics.

References

External links
 JRFU Player Profile
 

1993 births
Living people
People from Ōnojō
Male rugby sevens players
Rugby sevens players at the 2016 Summer Olympics
Olympic rugby sevens players of Japan
Japanese rugby sevens players
Japanese rugby union players
Japan international rugby union players
Kubota Spears Funabashi Tokyo Bay players
Japan international rugby sevens players
Rugby sevens players at the 2020 Summer Olympics
Rugby union fullbacks